Jaime Fernández Reyes (December 6, 1933 - April 15, 2005) is a Mexican actor.  Over his career, he won 3 Silver Ariel awards — the Mexican equivalent of the Oscar — including one for what is arguably his best-known role, playing Friday, the protagonist's associate in Luis Buñuel's Robinson Crusoe.  He appeared in over 200 films and served as the general secretary of the National Association of Actors (ANDA) for 11 years. His father is actor/director Emilio Fernández.

Filmography
 1948: Juan Charrasqueado ... Espectador pelea gallos (uncredited)
 1949: La malquerida ... Marcial, hijo de Eusebio (uncredited) 
 1949: Allá en el Rancho Grande (uncredited) 
 1950: Un día de vida ... Teniente 
 1950: Duelo en las montañas ... Pueblerino (uncredited) 
 1951: Maria Islands ... Ricardo 
 1952: When Children Sin ... Fidel
 1952: Soledad's Shawl ... Mauro 
 1952: Yo fui una callejera ... Vecino 
 1952: Carne de presidio ... Estudiante (uncredited) 
 1952: Mi campeón ... Espectador fútbol americano (uncredited) 
 1952: Viajera ... Estrada, estudiante (uncredited) 
 1952: El ceniciento ... Anunciador (uncredited) 
 1953: The Proud and the Beautiful
 1953: Northern Border ... Jimmy 
 1953: Los solterones ... Pancho (uncredited) 
 1953: Ambiciosa
 1953: El Bruto ... Julián García (uncredited) 
 1954: Sombra verde ... Bernabé 
 1954: La rebelión de los colgados ... Urbano 
 1954: Robinson Crusoe ... Friday
 1954: The Rapture (uncredited) 
 1954: The Three Elenas ... Pablo 
 1954: The River and Death ... Rómulo Menchaca 
 1955: La venganza del Diablo (uncredited) 
 1955: El Túnel 6 ... Rafael 
 1955: El monstruo en la sombra
 1955: Pecado mortal ... José María 
 1955: ...Y mañana serán mujeres
 1956: Talpa ... Esteban 
 1956: Massacre ... Juan Pedro (as Jamie Fernandez) 
 1957: La cabeza de Pancho Villa ... Compadre Eduardo Jiménez 
 1957: La marca de Satanás
 1957: El jinete sin cabeza ... Fernando
 1957: Morir de pie ... Pablo del Villar 
 1957: Las manzanas de Dorotea ... Alberto 
 1958: El jinete negro ... Jonás Pantoja 
 1958: Bajo el cielo de México ... Felipe 
 1958: El jinete solitario en el valle de los buitres
 1958: El Zorro escarlata en la venganza del ahorcado
 1958: Zonga, el ángel diabólico
 1958: Una cita de amor ... Román Chávez 
 1959: Sed de amor ... José 
 1959: El regreso del monstruo ... Don Esteban 
 1959: Besos de arena
 1960: Northern Courier
 1960: La ley de las pistolas
 1960: Comedians and Songs ... El Charrascas 
 1960: La máscara de hierro ... Manuel Noriega López 
 1960: El impostor
 1960: Vuelta al paraíso ... Felipe 
 1960: Herencia trágica ... Jonás Pantoja 
 1960: Calibre 44 ... Raúl
 1960: The Miracle Roses ... Nanoaltzin
 1960: Dos hijos desobedientes 
 1960: Una bala es mi testigo
 1961: El jinete enmascarado
 1961: Que me maten en tus brazos
 1961: Escuela de valientes
 1961: El hijo del charro negro ... Tiburcio González 
 1961: Bonitas las tapatías
 1961: El Bronco Reynosa
 1961: El padre Pistolas ... Gerencio Sánchez 
 1961: La máscara de la muerte
 1961: Una pasión me domina ... Crescencio 
 1962: ...Qué hacer con mis hijos...
 1962: Juramento de sangre
 1962: Lástima de ropa
 1962: El asaltacaminos
 1962: Horizontes de sangre
 1962: Camino de la horca ... Miguel 
 1962: Santo vs. las Mujeres Vampiro ... Inspector Carlos
 1962: El muchacho de Durango ... Juan 
 1962: El Zorro vengador
 1962: La trampa mortal ... Melquíades Sánchez 
 1962: El justiciero vengador ... Rómulo 
 1962: La venganza de la sombra ... Eduardo 
 1962: Santo Contra los Zombis ... Det. Rodríguez
 1962: Cazadores de cabezas ... Roberto 
 1962: El ataúd infernal
 1963: La sombra blanca
 1963: Los Chacales
 1963: El norteño
 1963: Baila mi amor
 1963: Así es mi México
 1963: La huella macabra ... Inspector Portillo 
 1963: Tormenta en el ring
 1963: Rutilo el forastero
 1963: Rostro infernal ... Inspector Portillo 
 1963: La Muerte en el desfiladero
 1963: El señor Tormenta
 1963: Alias El Alacrán ... Juan 
 1964: Los fenómenos del futbol
 1964: Canción del alma ... Ricardo 
 1964: El corrido de María Pistolas
 1965: El hijo de Gabino Barrera ... Martín Contreras 
 1965: Always Further On
 1965: Demonio azul
 1965: Nido de águilas ... Capitán Ramírez 
 1965: Gabino Barrera
 1966: A Bullet for the General ... General Elías
 1966: El mexicano
 1966: Hombres de roca
 1966: El alazán y el rosillo ... Juventino Torres 
 1966: Blue Demon contra el poder satánico
 1966: El caballo Bayo
 1967: The Partisan of Villa ... Coronel Gutiérrez 
 1967: Damiana y los hombres
 1967: Amanecí en tus brazos
 1967: La soldadera ... Juan 
 1967: El forastero vengador
 1967: Los hermanos Centella
 1968: La sombra del murciélago
 1968: Lucio Vázquez ... Emiliano Zapata 
 1968: No hay cruces en el mar ... Pedro 
 1968: Guns for San Sebastian ... 'Golden Lance' 
 1968: Day of the Evil Gun ... Addis' Indian scout (uncredited) 
 1968: Desnudarse y morir
 1968: Caballo prieto azabache ... Rodolfo Fierro 
 1969: El último pistolero
 1969: Romance sobre ruedas ... Jaime
 1969: Lauro Puñales ... General Emiliano Zapata 
 1970: Emiliano Zapata ... Montaño
 1970: El oficio más antiguo del mundo ... Teniente Julio Avila 
 1972: Ni solteros, ni casados
 1974: Peregrina
 1974: La muerte de Pancho Villa ... Melitón Lozaya 
 1976: The Bricklayers ... Pérez Gómez 
 1976: Longitud de guerra
 1976: Chicano
 1977: El mexicano
 1977: El moro de Cumpas
 1978: Los triunfadores
 1979: Benjamín Argumedo el rebelde ... General carrancista 
 1979: La mafia de la frontera ... Layo 
 1979: Tierra sangrienta
 1980: Persecución y muerte de Benjamín Argumedo ... General carrancista 
 1981: La cosecha de mujeres
 1982: San Juan de Dios es Jalisco
 1988: Mi fantasma y yo
 1989: Al filo de la muerte ... El Pocho 
 1989: En los cuernos de la muerte
 1990: El aduanal
 1991: Bronco
 1994: Juana la Cubana
 1995: La fuga de los Pérez
 1995: Llamada anónima
 1995: Los cargadores
 1995: Crimen en Chihuahua
 1996: ¡Ay! Rateros no se rajen ... Comandante 
 1996: El gato de Chihuahua
 1997: Crímenes del pasado ... Detective 
 1997: Los peluqueros ... Blas Anguiano 
 1998: El corrido de Santa Amalia
 1998: Fuera de la ley
 1999: El jardinero ... Adán Moreno 
 1999: Oficio mortal
 2000: Cuenta saldada ... Rufino 
 2000: Noches violentas
 2000: El jueves no matamos
 2001: Muertes a medianoche ... Director Policía 
 2002: Pedro el quemado
 2003: La guarecita de Michoacán

External links

 En Cine Mexicano

1937 births
2005 deaths
20th-century Mexican male actors
Mexican male film actors
Male actors from Monterrey